Fredrik Johansson (born September 9, 1984) is a Swedish Bandy player who currently plays for Vetlanda BK as a midfielder.

Fredrik has only played for two clubs-
 Vetlanda BK (2001-)
 Öjaby IS (2002-2003)

External links
  Fredrik Johansson at bandysidan
  vetlanda bk

Johansson,Fredrik
Living people
1984 births
Vetlanda BK players
Nässjö IF players
Place of birth missing (living people)